Vito "Babe" Parilli (May 7, 1930 – July 15, 2017) was an American football quarterback and coach who played professionally for 18 seasons. Parilli spent five seasons in the National Football League (NFL), three in the Canadian Football League (CFL), and 10 in the American Football League (AFL). He played college football at Kentucky, where he twice received consensus All-American honors and won two consecutive bowl games.

Parilli achieved his greatest professional success in the AFL as the starting quarterback of the Boston Patriots from 1961 to 1967. He earned three All-Star Game selections, while leading the Patriots to their only AFL postseason and championship game appearance in 1963. Present for the entirety of the AFL's existence, Parilli played his final seasons for the New York Jets and was part of the team that won a Super Bowl title in Super Bowl III. After retiring as a player, he served as a coach in the NFL, World Football League, and Arena Football League from 1973 to 1997. He was inducted to the College Football Hall of Fame in 1982.

Early years
Parilli was born and raised in Rochester, Pennsylvania, an industrial town northwest of Pittsburgh, Parilli graduated from Rochester High School in 1948.

College career
Parilli played college football at the University of Kentucky in Lexington, and was a quarterback for the Wildcats under head coach Paul "Bear" Bryant. He was a consensus All-American in 1950 and 1951 and was fourth in the Heisman Trophy voting in 1950 and third in 1951. He led the Wildcats to victories in consecutive New Year's Day bowl games in the 1951 Sugar Bowl and 1952 Cotton Bowl.

Statistics

Football career

Early years
Parilli was the fourth overall selection of the 1952 NFL draft, taken by the Green Bay Packers. 
He played two seasons with the Packers, two with the Ottawa Rough Riders in Canada, one with the Cleveland Browns in 1956, two more with the Packers, and another with Ottawa in 1959.

AFL
At age 30, Parilli was picked up by the Oakland Raiders of the fledgling American Football League on August 17, 1960, and threw for just over 1,000 yards that season.

On April 4, 1961, he was part of a five-player trade that sent him to the Boston Patriots, and he went on to become one of the AFL's most productive and colorful players.  Playing for the Patriots from 1961 through 1967, Parilli finished his career with over 25,000 total yards and 200 touchdowns, ending among the top five quarterbacks in 23 categories such as passing yards, passing touchdowns and rushing yards. Parilli was selected for three All-Star Games. In 1964, throwing primarily to Gino Cappelletti, Parilli amassed nearly 3,500 yards passing with 31 touchdowns; the latter was a Patriots record until Tom Brady broke it in 2007. During that season's contest against the Oakland Raiders on October 16, he threw for 422 yards and four touchdown passes in a 43–43 tie. Parilli is a member of the Patriots All-1960s (AFL) Team.

Parilli completed his career with the New York Jets, where he earned a ring as Joe Namath's backup in Super Bowl III, when the Jets stunned the Baltimore Colts by a 16–7 score. Coincidentally, this gave the Jets two quarterbacks from Pennsylvania's Beaver County, with Parilli being from Rochester and Namath being from nearby Beaver Falls and both played for "Bear" Bryant in college, Namath at Alabama. In 1967, it was discovered by Life magazine that Parilli and several other professional athletes were regular patrons of Patriarca crime family mobster Arthur Ventola's major fencing operation called Arthur's Farm in Revere, Massachusetts. Despite the organized crime connection, journalist Howie Carr stated that there was never any inside information passed between Parilli and Ventola. Arthur was the uncle of mob associate Richard Castucci.

Besides his considerable skills as a quarterback, he was one of the best holders in the history of football and was nicknamed "gold-finger" as a result of kicker Jim Turner's then-record 145 points kicked in 1968 (plus another 19 points in the play-offs and in Super Bowl III). He is one of only 20 players who were in the American Football League for its entire ten-year existence, and is a member of the University of Kentucky Athletic Hall of Fame. In 1982, Parilli was named to the College Football Hall of Fame.

Because of their Italian surnames, the Patriots' wide receiver-quarterback duo of Cappelletti and Parilli was nicknamed "Grand Opera."

Parilli retired as a player at the age of 40 in August 1970.

Coaching career
In 1974, Parilli became the head coach of the New York Stars of the World Football League; after going bankrupt, the franchise moved to Charlotte mid-season. The next year, he was tabbed as coach of the WFL's Chicago Winds, and briefly seemed to have a chance to coach his old teammate, Joe Namath. But Namath turned Chicago down, and Parilli was replaced in late July after only two pre-season games. (The Winds would play only five regular-season contests before folding, and the rest of the WFL would collapse a few months later.) Parilli would later coach in the Arena Football League, helming the New England Steamrollers, Denver Dynamite, Charlotte Rage, Las Vegas Sting, Anaheim Piranhas and Florida Bobcats.

Death
Parilli died on July 15, 2017, in Parker, Colorado of multiple myeloma at the age of 87.

Honors
Parilli was elected to the College Football Hall of Fame in 1982. On November 15, 2014, he was inducted into the National Italian American Sports Hall of Fame.

See also
 List of NCAA major college football yearly passing leaders
Other American Football League players

References

External links
 New England Patriots bio
  
 Just Sports Stats - Playing
 Just Sports Stats - Coaching

1930 births
2017 deaths
Deaths from multiple myeloma
All-American college football players
American football quarterbacks
Canadian football quarterbacks
American players of Canadian football
Boston Patriots players
Cleveland Browns players
Kentucky Wildcats football players
Green Bay Packers players
New England Patriots players
New England Patriots coaches
New York Jets players
Oakland Raiders players
Ottawa Rough Riders players
American Football League All-Star players
People from Rochester, Pennsylvania
Players of American football from Pennsylvania
Sportspeople from the Pittsburgh metropolitan area
American people of Italian descent
Denver Broncos coaches
Charlotte Rage coaches
Charlotte Hornets (WFL) coaches
Denver Dynamite (arena football) coaches
Anaheim Piranhas coaches
Florida Bobcats coaches
American Football League players